Andrew Stevenson (born 7 December 1957), also known as Herb Stevenson, is a former New Zealand rower.

At the 1982 World Rowing Championships at Rotsee, Switzerland, he won a gold medal with the New Zealand eight in the 7 seat. At the 1983 World Rowing Championships at Wedau in Duisburg, Germany, he won a gold medal with the New Zealand eight in the 7 seat.

In 1982, the 1982 rowing eight crew was named sportsman of the year. The 1982 team was inducted into the New Zealand Sports Hall of Fame in 1995. He was 4th in the Eight final at the 1984 Los Angeles Olympics. In 1986 he won a silver medal in the coxless four at the Commonwealth Games in Edinburgh in a boat with Shane O'Brien, Neil Gibson, and Don Symon. He also won a bronze medal with the men's eight.

References

1957 births
Living people
New Zealand male rowers
Rowers at the 1984 Summer Olympics
Olympic rowers of New Zealand
World Rowing Championships medalists for New Zealand
Commonwealth Games medallists in rowing
Commonwealth Games silver medallists for New Zealand
Commonwealth Games bronze medallists for New Zealand
Rowers at the 1986 Commonwealth Games
Medallists at the 1986 Commonwealth Games